The 1990 Florida Citrus Bowl was a post-season American college football bowl game at the Florida Citrus Bowl stadium in Orlando, Florida between the University of Illinois Fighting Illini and the Virginia Cavaliers on January 1, 1990. The game was the final contest of the 1989 NCAA Division I-A football season for both teams, and ended in a 31–21 victory for Illinois.

Game summary 
Illinois snapped a 26-year bowl victory drought with a 31–21 win over Virginia in the Florida Citrus Bowl. Illinois jumped on the Cavaliers early, with linebacker Bill Henkel recovering a fumble on the opening kickoff. Five plays later, quarterback Jeff George drilled a 15-yard scoring strike to Steven Williams. After Virginia tied the game early in the second quarter, George directed Illinois on an 80-yard scoring drive. Illinois opened the second half with an 84-yard drive capped by fullback Howard Griffith's three-yard touchdown. Early in the fourth quarter, receiver Mike Bellamy scored on a 26-yard pass from George to clinch an Illini victory. George earned MVP honors, completing 26-of-38 for 321 yards and three TDs.

Scoring summary

Statistical summary
Team Statistics

(Rushing-Passing-Total): UI – 176-321-497; UV – 110-112-322.

Individual Statistical Leaders

Rushing (Att.-Yds.-TD): UI – Griffith 18-93-0, Steve Feagin 10-54-0;   UV – Terry Kirby 8-64-0.

Passing (Att.-Comp.-Int.-TD-Yds.): UI – George 38-26-1-3-321; UV – S. Moore 27-17-2-2-191.

Receiving (No.-Yds.-TD): UI – Bellamy 8-166-1, Williams 4-45-1; UV – Finkelston 3-69-1, Herman Moore 5-56-1.

References

Florida Citrus Bowl
Citrus Bowl (game)
Illinois Fighting Illini football bowl games
Virginia Cavaliers football bowl games
Florida Citrus Bowl
Florida Citrus Bowl